Gifted is the first full-length album by Jamaican reggae singer Koffee. It was released on 25 March 2022 by Promised Land Recordings.

Background

The album was preceded by the single "Lockdown", a commentary on the COVID-19 pandemic released in the summer of 2020. Many of the album's lyrics focus on themes of perseverance and overcoming struggles. Gifted expands beyond the dancehall reggae of Koffee's debut EP Rapture (2019), into roots reggae, pop, and R&B influences. The album's lyrics include homages to influential reggae musicians and Jamaican culture, and includes a prominent sample from "Redemption Song" by Bob Marley.

Critical reception
The album received generally favorable reviews from critics, often due to its positive lyrical attitude. Pitchfork praised the album as "Breezy, uplifting, and never forced" with a "a proud and pure undertone" to Koffee's performances. NME praised Koffee's "effortless vocals, smart lyricism and obvious ability to craft new bangers". Rolling Stone praised the album as "a portrait of a brilliant young artist keenly aware of the miracles that lift her up". Medium noted that the album's title is a valid description of Koffee's abilities, and concluded that the album "fires on all cylinders" with a "sunny and multifaceted" sound, but at just 28 minutes it is too short to satisfy all listeners. 

Some reviewers were more critical. For example, a reviewer for Slant Magazine stated that the album's boastful attitude and frequent allusions to modern trends "can feel awkward and misplaced", while the album only partially displays Koffee's strengths as a singer and songwriter. The Guardian noted that Koffee's "desire to appeal to a broad audience causes the album to stumble", and added that some genre experiments are uninspired, but concluded that the album is generally "smart and inventive".

Track listing

References

2022 albums